The Steel Guitar Hall of Fame is an organization established in the United States in 1978 to recognize achievement in the art of playing the steel guitar. The organization's stated purpose is: In 1984, the organization was incorporated as a nonprofit organization in St. Louis, Missouri. When the Hall of Fame award was initiated in 1978, the awarding body's title was established as the "Steel Guitar Convention Board."  For the first nine years of the awarding activity, board members themselves donated the funds to cover the awards.  It was not until 1987 that sufficient funds were first raised to cover the annual awards costs.  This was derived from individual contributors, from sanctioned benefit shows, and from funds raised at the annual International Steel Guitar Convention in St. Louis.
 
The idea of a hall of fame was first proposed by Nashville steel guitarist Jim Vest in the early 1970s. Vest intended to develop it, but his recording session work did not allow the time. By mutual agreement, Dewitt Scott took the responsibility and inaugurated the Hall of Fame in St. Louis in 1978. Scott is one of the founders who, for over 40 years conducted an annual international steel guitar convention featuring a fund-raising concert for the organization by renowned guitarists. One and sometimes two members are inducted annually.  One plaque is forged for each inductee and has been displayed in St Louis' Millennium Hotel as a temporary site. A smaller replica is given to each inductee.  The plaques were cast by sculptor Chris Unterseher in bronze bas-relief, depicting a likeness of the inductee followed by a brief résumé of his accomplishments. The text on each plaque was written by Tom Bradshaw. The organization contains inductees from outside the U.S. and is sometimes referred to as the "International Steel Guitar Hall of Fame" to distinguish it from various regional associations.

The first woman to become a member was Barbara Mandrell in 2009 An ongoing goal of the hall of fame is to secure a permanent museum site to display artifacts and plaques.

Inductees
  
1978 — Jerry Byrd
1978 — Leon McAuliffe
1978 — Alvino Rey
1979 — Herb Remington
1979 — Sol Hoopii
1980 — Joaquin Murphey
1980 — Speedy West
1981 — Noel Boggs
1981 — Buddy Emmons
1982 — Jimmy Day
1982 — Dick Kaihue McIntire
1983 — Eddie Alkire
1983 — Ralph Mooney
1984 — Don Helms
1984 — Bud Isaacs
1985 — "Little" Roy Wiggins
1985 — Curly Chalker
1986 — Harold "Shot" Jackson
1987 — Pete Drake
1988 — Lloyd Green
1989 — Billy Bowman
1989 — Hal Rugg
1990 — Bob White
1990 — David Kelii
1991 — Zane Beck
1992 — Tom Brumley
1992 — Dewitt Scott
1992 — Bob Dunn
1993 — Joseph Kekuku
1993 — Buddy Charleton
1994 — Doug Jernigan
1995 — Freddie Tavares
1995 —  Bobby Garrett
1996 — John Hughey
1997 — Weldon Myrick
1998 — Johnny Sibert
1999 — Barney Alvin Kalanikau Isaacs Jr
1999 — Jeff Newman
2000 — Jimmie Crawford
2000 — Paul Franklin
2001 — Tom Morrell
2001 — Herbie Wallace
2002 — "Pee Wee" Whitewing
2002 — Santo & Johnny Farina
2003 — Walter Haynes
2003 — JayDee Maness
2004 — Bobby Koefer
2004 — Jody Carver
2004 — Bobby Black
2005 — Orville "Red" Rhodes
2005 — Leonard T. Zinn
2006 — Rico Turchetti
2006 — Tom Bradshaw
2006 — Maurice Anderson
2007 — "Sneaky" Pete Kleinow
2007 — Roy Ayres
2008 — Julian Tharpe
2008 — Norm Hamlett
2008 — Don Warden
2009 — Bud Carter
2009 — Barbara Mandrell
2009 — Ron Elliott
2010 — Winnie Winston
2010 — Bobby Caldwell
2010 — Dick Overby
2011 — Bobbe Seymour
2011 — Larry Sasser
2011 — Russ Hicks
2012 — Terry Bethel
2012 — Kayton Roberts
2013 — Rusty Young
2013 — Tommy White
2013 — Lynn Owsley
2014 — Joe Wright
2014 — Sonny Garrish
2014 — Jim Vest
2015 — Gene Fields
2015 — Chubby Howard
2016 — Dell Mullens
2016 — Neil Flanz

References

External links
Danish article on same subject

Halls of fame in Missouri
Music halls of fame
Organizations established in 1978